Now is the eighth studio album by American singer-songwriter and pianist Patrice Rushen issued in May 1984 on Elektra Records. The album rose to No. 7 on the Billboard Traditional Jazz Albums chart, No. 4 on the Billboard Top Soul Albums chart and No. 40 on the Billboard 200 chart.

Singles
"Feels So Real (Won't Let Go)" rose to No. 3 on the Billboard Hot Soul Songs chart and No. 10 on the Billboard Dance Club Songs chart. "Get Off (You Fascinate Me)" also got to No. 26 on the Billboard Hot Soul Songs chart.

Track listing
All tracks composed by Patrice Rushen and Freddie "Ready Freddie" Washington; except where indicated. 
 "Feels So Real (Won't Let Go)" (Rushen) - 6:48
 "Gone with the Night" - 4:40
 "Gotta Find It" (Rushen, Roy Galloway) - 4:26
 "Superstar" (Rushen, Romeo Williams) - 4:56
 "Heartache Heartbreak" - 4:10
 "Get Off (You Fascinate Me)" - 6:18
 "My Love's Not Going Anywhere" (Rushen, Roy Galloway) - 4:18
 "Perfect Love" - 4:54
 "High in Me" (Rushen, Syreeta Wright) - 4:13
 "To Each His Own" (Rushen, Lynn Davis) - 4:12

Personnel 
 Patrice Rushen – backing vocals, synthesizers, Rhodes piano (1, 3, 5-10), electric grand piano (2, 4), lead vocals (2, 4, 7, 9, 10), synth bass (6); rhythm, synthesizer and vocal arrangements
 Paul Fox – synthesizer programming 
 Greg Moore – guitar (1, 3, 4, 6-9)
 Marlo Henderson – guitar (2)
 Freddie Washington – bass (1, 6-10), rhythm arrangements (1, 8), backing vocals (8)
 Romeo Williams – bass (4)
 Paulinho da Costa – timbales (1), percussion (6, 9)
 Harvey Mason – cymbals (5, 7), tom tom fills (5), Simmons toms (7, 9)
 Gerald Albright – saxophone solo (5), bass (6)
 Roy Galloway – backing vocals (1, 3, 7, 8)
 Lynn Davis – backing vocals (5, 6)
 Jim Gilstrap – backing vocals (5, 6)

Production 
 Patrice Rushen – producer, executive producer, assistant engineer 
 Charles Mims Jr. – producer
 Peter Chaikin – recording engineer 
 Sabrina Buchanek – assistant engineer 
 Paul Ericksen – assistant engineer 
 Ross Pallone – assistant engineer 
 Csaba Petocz – assistant engineer 
 Jeff Stebbins – assistant engineer 
 F. Byron Clark – remixing 
 John Golden – mastering 
 Betty Chow – art direction, design 
 Cathy Henszey – art direction, design
 Bobby Holland – album photography
 Peter Breza – photography assistant
 Roger Dong – photography assistant
 Jacqueline Sallow – inner sleeve photography 
 Sherwin Bash – management 

Studios
 Recorded at The Crib (Los Angeles, CA); Conway Studios and Larrabee Sound Studios (Hollywood, CA).
 Remixed at Soundcastle and Hollywood Sound Recorders (Hollywood, CA).
 Mastered at K Disc Mastering (Hollywood, CA).

References

Patrice Rushen albums
1984 albums